Anquette is an American contemporary R&B group from Miami, Florida, U.S. They debuted with her answer version of the 2 Live Crew's "Throw the D", titled "Throw the P" (1986). Anquette's debut LP Respect (1988) featured a version of Aretha Franklin's "Respect" as well as "I Will Always Be There for You", which peaked at #76 on Billboard's Hot R&B/Hip-Hop Singles and Tracks chart in 1989) and a rap track titled "Janet Reno". Other noteworthy tunes include "Ghetto Style" and "Shake It (Do the 61st)". Anquette came back in 1997 with the tune "My Baby Mama," an answer rap to B-Rock and the Bizz's "My Baby Daddy".

Discography
 1988 Respect (Skyywalker). Billboard Top R&B/Hip-Hop Albums peak #41.

References

1972 births
American women rappers
African-American women rappers
Living people
Rappers from Miami
Southern hip hop groups
Musical groups from Miami
African-American musical groups
Women hip hop groups
21st-century African-American people
21st-century African-American women
20th-century African-American people
20th-century African-American women